
Janq'u Quta (Aymara janq'u white, quta lake, "white lake", Hispanicized spelling Jankho Kkota, Janko Khota, Janko Kota) is a lake in the Cordillera Real of Bolivia located in the La Paz Department, Los Andes Province, Batallas Municipality, Kirani Canton. It lies north-west of the Kunturiri massif, east of Wila Lluxi and south of Janq'u Uyu. Janq'u Quta is situated at a height of about 4,940 metres (16,210 ft), about 0.95 km long and 0.38 km at its widest point.

See also 
 Jach'a Jawira
 Jisk'a Pata
 Phaq'u Kiwuta
 Q'ara Quta
 Warawarani
 Wila Lluxita

External links 
 Batallas Municipality: population data and map. Janq'u Quta (unnamed) is the lake east of Wila Lluxi ("Wila Lloje"), in Kirani Canton.

References 

Lakes of La Paz Department (Bolivia)